Make Something Edmonton is a community building initiative that resulted from the creation of a task force on City image and reputation in July 2012 in Edmonton, Alberta. The task force is co-chaired by entrepreneur Chris LaBossiere and Rapid Fire Theatre artistic director Amy Shostak. The creative concept behind the initiative was articulated by local writer and entrepreneur Todd Babiak.

The central idea behind the initiative is that "Edmonton is an unusually good city to create something from nothing, to launch a new idea, to build, to get ‘er done, to make something."

See also 
 Keep Austin Weird

References

External links 
 makesomethingedmonton.ca 

Organizations based in Edmonton